Archer Creek is a stream in Benton County, Missouri. It is a tributary of Big Buffalo Creek.

Archer Creek most likely was named after the local Archer family.

See also
List of rivers of Missouri

References

Rivers of Benton County, Missouri
Rivers of Missouri